Diclazuril (trade name Vecoxan) is a coccidiostat.

See also 
 Clazuril
 Ponazuril
 Toltrazuril

References 

Antiparasitic agents
Nitriles
Chlorobenzenes
Triazines
Lactams
Ureas